Paul Windle Municipal Airport  is a closed and no longer used airport located east of the central business district of Greensburg, a city in Kiowa County, Kansas, United States. The airport was owned by the City of Greensburg and named in honor of Captain Paul R. "Windy" Windle (1934-1965) who learned to fly at this airport and was killed in action during the Vietnam War.

Facilities and aircraft 
It has two runways, both now closed, with turf surfaces: 2/20 was 2,600 by 130 feet (792 x 40 m) and 17/35 was 2,400 by 290 feet (732 x 88 m).

References

External links 
  at Kansas DOT Airport Directory (note incorrect spelling)
 

Defunct airports in Kansas
Airports in Kansas
Buildings and structures in Kiowa County, Kansas